Van Cortlandt Upper Manor House is a historic home of the van Cortlandt family located in Cortlandt Manor, Westchester County, New York. The original house was built about 1773 and subsequently enlarged and altered a number of times.

History
The original structure is a -story, five-bay brick house, altered by the Van Cortlandt family in the 1830s. It has a gable roof covered in slate. A large -story frame wing covered in stucco was built in the 1920s. It was built or remodeled in 1773 by Pierre Van Cortlandt. After 1783, the house was occupied by his son Pierre Van Cortlandt, Jr. (1762–1848) until his death.  In 1889, the house was converted for use as a convalescent home and was later used as a nursing home.

Revolutionary War
During the American Revolutionary War, the house served as headquarters for General George Washington from November 10 to 12, 1776; November 28 to 30, 1779; and June 25 to July 2, 1781.

It was added to the National Register of Historic Places in 1981.

See also
 List of Washington's Headquarters during the Revolutionary War

References

Houses on the National Register of Historic Places in New York (state)
Houses completed in 1773
Houses in Westchester County, New York
National Register of Historic Places in Westchester County, New York